Alexander Grigoryevitch Fridlender (2/15 July 1906 – 13 September 1980) was a Soviet composer, pianist and conductor, Professor at the Urals Mussorgsky State Conservatoire.

Career 
Fridlender was born in Saint Petersburg. He studied at the Leningrad Central Music College (1925–1929) and graduated from the Leningrad Conservatory in 1933. He then worked as the conductor of the Voronezh Radio Symphony Orchestra in 1934–1935, the Odessa Opera and Ballet Theater (1936). After that he moved to Sverdlovsk. He spent the rest of his life there. Fridlender conducted the orchestra of the Sverdlovsk State Philharmonic Hall (1939–1941, 1947–1974) and the State Academic Opera and Ballet Theatre (1943–1947). He taught at the Urals Mussorgsky State Conservatoire. He composed several operas, instrumental music such as suites, music for plays, songs.

Selected compositions
 1941: The Mountain Fairy Tale, a ballet based on "The Mistress of the Copper Mountain".
 1944: The Stone Flower, a ballet based on the story of the same name.
 1958: Without a Dowry, a ballet based on the play of the same name.
 1962: Snow, a ballet
 1966: Zoya, a choreographic poem
 1967: Petersburgers, an opera based on the poem by Olga Bergholz.
 1970: The Cake in the Sky, a comedy opera based on the story by Gianni Rodari La torta in cielo.
 1977: Lieutenant Lermontov, a choreographic poem

References

External links
  List of compositions

1906 births
1980 deaths
Russian ballet composers
Composers for piano
Russian opera composers
Male opera composers
Russian male classical composers
Soviet composers
Soviet male composers
20th-century classical composers
Saint Petersburg Conservatory alumni
20th-century Russian male musicians